Ssehura, more known by her European given name Sarah Baartman (1789– 29 December 1815), also spelt Sara, sometimes in the diminutive form Saartje, or Saartjie, and Bartman, Bartmann, was a Khoikhoi woman who was exhibited as a freak show attraction in 19th-century Europe under the name Hottentot Venus, a name which was later attributed to at least one other woman similarly exhibited. The women were exhibited for their steatopygic body type uncommon in Western Europe which not only was perceived as a curiosity at that time, but became subject of scientific interest as well as of erotic projection.

"Venus" is sometimes used to designate representations of the female body in arts and cultural anthropology, referring to the Roman goddess of love and fertility. "Hottentot" was the colonial-era term for the indigenous Khoikhoi people of southwestern Africa, now usually considered an offensive term. The Sarah Baartman story is often regarded as the epitome of racist colonial exploitation, and of the commodification of the dehumanization of black people.

Life

Early life in the Cape Colony 
Ssehura was born to a Khoekhoe family in the vicinity of the Camdeboo in what is now the Eastern Cape of South Africa (then the Dutch Cape Colony; a British colony by the time she was an adult). Saartjie is the diminutive form of Sarah, the name given to her by europeans; in Cape Dutch the use of the diminutive form commonly indicated familiarity, endearment or contempt. Her surname has also been spelt Bartman and Bartmann. She was an infant when her mother died and her father was later killed by Bushmen (San people) while driving cattle.

Baartman spent her childhood and teenage years on Dutch European farms. She went through puberty rites, and kept the small tortoise shell necklace, most likely given to her by her mother, until her death in France. In the 1790s, a free black (a designation for individuals of enslaved descent) trader named Peter Cesars (also recorded as Caesar) met her and encouraged her to move to Cape Town. Records do not show whether she was made to leave, went willingly, or was sent by her family to Cesars. She lived in Cape Town for at least two years working in households as a washerwoman and a nursemaid, first for Peter Cesars, then in the house of a Dutch man in Cape Town. She finally moved to be a wet-nurse in the household of Peter Cesars' brother, Hendrik Cesars, outside of Cape Town in present day Woodstock. There is evidence that she had two children, though both died as babies. She had a relationship with a poor Dutch soldier, Hendrik van Jong, who lived in Hout Bay near Cape Town, but the relationship ended when his regiment left the Cape.

Hendrik Cesars began to show her at the city hospital in exchange for cash, where surgeon Alexander Dunlop worked. Dunlop, (sometimes wrongly cited as William Dunlop), a Scottish military surgeon in the Cape slave lodge, operated a side business in supplying showmen in Britain with animal specimens, and suggested she travel to Europe to make money by exhibiting herself. Baartman refused. Dunlop persisted, and Baartman said she would not go unless Hendrik Cesars came too. He also refused, but he finally agreed in 1810 to go to Britain to make money by putting Baartman on stage. The party left for London in 1810. It is unknown whether Baartman went willingly or was forced.

Dunlop was the frontman and conspirator behind the plan to exhibit Baartman. According to a British legal report of 26 November 1810, an affidavit supplied to the Court of King's Bench from a "Mr. Bullock of Liverpool Museum" stated: "some months since a Mr. Alexander Dunlop, who, he believed, was a surgeon in the army, came to him to sell the skin of a Camelopard, which he had brought from the Cape of Good Hope.... Some time after, Mr. Dunlop again called on Mr. Bullock, and told him, that he had then on her way from the Cape, a female Hottentot, of very singular appearance; that she would make the fortune of any person who shewed her in London, and that he (Dunlop) was under an engagement to send her back in two years..." Lord Caledon, governor of the Cape, gave permission for the trip, but later said regretted it after he fully learned the purpose of the trip.

On display in Europe 

Hendrik Cesars and Alexander Dunlop brought Baartman to London in 1810. The group lived together in Duke Street, St. James, the most expensive part of London. In the household were Sarah Baartman, Hendrik Cesars, Alexander Dunlop, and two African boys, probably brought illegally by Dunlop from the slave lodge in Cape Town.

Dunlop had to have Baartman exhibited and Cesars was the showman. Dunlop exhibited Baartman at the Egyptian Room at the London residence of Thomas Hope at No. 10 Duchess Street, Cavendish Square, London. Dunlop thought he could make money because of Londoners' lack of familiarity with Africans and because of Baartman's pejoratively perceived large buttocks. Crais and Scully say: "People came to see her because they saw her not as a person but as a pure example of this one part of the natural world". She became known as the "Hottentot Venus" (as was at least one other woman, in 1829). A handwritten note made on an exhibition flyer by someone who saw Baartman in London in January 1811 indicates curiosity about her origins and probably reproduced some of the language from the exhibition; thus the following origin story should be treated with skepticism: "Sartjee is 22 Years old is 4 feet 10 Inches high, and has (for a Hottentot) a good capacity. She lived in the occupation of a Cook at the Cape of Good Hope. Her Country is situated not less than 600 Miles from the Cape, the Inhabitants of which are rich in Cattle and sell them by barter for a mere trifle. A Bottle of Brandy, or small roll of Tobacco will purchase several Sheep – Their principal trade is in Cattle Skins or Tallow. – Beyond this Nation is an other, of small stature, very subtle & fierce; the Dutch could not bring them under subjection, and shot them whenever they found them. 9 Jany, 1811. [H.C.?]" The tradition of freak shows was well established in Europe at this time, and historians have argued that this is at first how Baartman was displayed. Baartman never allowed herself to be exhibited nude, and an account of her appearance in London in 1810 makes it clear that she was wearing a garment, albeit a tight-fitting one. She became a subject of scientific interest, albeit of racist bias frequently, as well as of erotic projection. She was marketed as the "missing link between man and beast".

Her exhibition in London just a few years after the passing of the 1807 Slave Trade Act, which abolished the slave trade, created a scandal. A British abolitionist society, the African Association, conducted a newspaper campaign for her release. The British abolitionist Zachary Macaulay led the protest, with Hendrik Cesars protesting in response that Baartman was entitled to earn her living, stating: "has she not as good a right to exhibit herself as an Irish Giant or a Dwarf?" Cesars was comparing Baartman to the contemporary Irish giants Charles Byrne and Patrick Cotter O'Brien. Macaulay and The African Association took the matter to court and on 24 November 1810 at the Court of King's Bench the Attorney-General began the attempt "to give her liberty to say whether she was exhibited by her own consent." In support he produced two affidavits in court. The first, from a William Bullock of Liverpool Museum, was intended to show that Baartman had been brought to Britain by individuals who referred to her as if she were property. The second, by the Secretary of the African Association, described the degrading conditions under which she was exhibited and also gave evidence of coercion. Baartman was then questioned before an attorney in Dutch, in which she was fluent, via interpreters.

Historians have subsequently stated doubts on the veracity and independence of the statement that Baartman then made. She stated that she in fact was not under restraint, had not been sexually abused and had come to London on her own free will. She also did not wish to return to her family and understood perfectly that she was guaranteed half of the profits. The case was therefore dismissed. She was questioned for three hours. The statements directly contradict accounts of her exhibitions made by Zachary Macaulay of the African Institution and other eyewitnesses. A written contract was produced, which is considered by some modern commentators to be a legal subterfuge.

The publicity given by the court case increased Baartman's popularity as an exhibit. She later toured other parts of England and was exhibited at a fair in Limerick, Ireland in 1812. She also was exhibited at a fair at Bury St Edmunds in Suffolk. On 1 December 1811 Baartman was baptised at Manchester Cathedral and there is evidence that she got married on the same day.

Later life 
A man called Henry Taylor took Baartman to France around September 1814. Taylor then sold her to a man sometimes reported as an animal trainer, S. Réaux, but whose name was actually Jean Riaux and belonged to a ballet master who had been deported from the Cape Colony for seditious behaviour. Riaux exhibited her under more pressured conditions for 15 months at the Palais Royal in Paris. In France she was in effect enslaved. In Paris, her exhibition became more clearly entangled with scientific racism. French scientists were curious about whether she had the elongated labia which earlier naturalists such as François Levaillant had purportedly observed in Khoisan at the Cape. French naturalists, among them Georges Cuvier, head keeper of the menagerie at the Muséum national d'Histoire naturelle and founder of the discipline of comparative anatomy, visited her. She was the subject of several scientific paintings at the Jardin du Roi, where she was examined in March 1815: as naturalist Étienne Geoffroy Saint-Hilaire and Frédéric Cuvier, a younger brother of Georges, reported: "she was obliging enough to undress and to allow herself to be painted in the nude". This was not really true: Although by his standards she appeared to be naked, she wore a small apron-like garment which concealed her genitalia throughout these sessions, in accordance with her own cultural norms of modesty. She steadfastly refused to remove this even when offered money by one of the attending scientists.

She was brought out as an exhibit at wealthy people's parties and private salons. In Paris, Baartman's promoters did not need to concern themselves with slavery charges. Crais and Scully state: "By the time she got to Paris, her existence was really quite miserable and extraordinarily poor. Sara was literally treated like an animal. There is some evidence to suggest that at one point a collar was placed around her neck." At the end of her life she was a prostitute, and penniless.

Death and aftermath 
Baartman died on 29 December 1815 around age 26, of an undetermined inflammatory ailment, possibly smallpox, while other sources suggest she contracted syphilis, or pneumonia. Cuvier conducted a dissection but no autopsy to inquire into the reasons for Baartman's death.

The French anatomist Henri Marie Ducrotay de Blainville published notes on the dissection in 1816, which were republished by Georges Cuvier in the Memoires du Museum d'Histoire Naturelle in 1817. Cuvier, who had met Baartman, notes in his monograph that its subject was an intelligent woman with an excellent memory, particularly for faces. In addition to her native tongue, she spoke fluent Dutch, passable English, and a smattering of French. He describes her shoulders and back as "graceful", arms "slender", hands and feet as "charming" and "pretty". He adds she was adept at playing the Jew's harp, could dance according to the traditions of her country, and had a lively personality. Despite this, Cuvier interpreted her remains, in accordance with his theories on racial evolution, as evidencing ape-like traits. He thought her small ears were similar to those of an orangutan and also compared her vivacity, when alive, to the quickness of a monkey. He was part of a movement of scientists who were aiming to codify a hierarchy of races with the white man at the top.

Display of remains
Saint-Hilaire applied on behalf of the Muséum d' Histoire Naturelle to retain her remains (Cuvier had preserved her brain, genitalia and skeleton), on the grounds that it was of a singular specimen of humanity and therefore of special scientific interest. The application was approved and Baartman's skeleton and body cast were displayed in Muséum d'histoire naturelle d’Angers. Her skull was stolen in 1827 but returned a few months later. The restored skeleton and skull continued to arouse the interest of visitors until the remains were moved to the Musée de l'Homme, when it was founded in 1937, and continued up until the late 1970s. Her body cast and skeleton stood side by side and faced away from the viewer which emphasised her steatopygia (accumulation of fat on the buttocks) while reinforcing that aspect as the primary interest of her body. The Baartman exhibit proved popular until it elicited complaints for being a degrading representation of women. The skeleton was removed in 1974, and the body cast in 1976.

From the 1940s, there were sporadic calls for the return of her remains. A poem written in 1978 by South African poet Diana Ferrus, herself of Khoisan descent, entitled "I've come to take you home", played a pivotal role in spurring the movement to bring Baartman's remains back to her birth soil. The case gained world-wide prominence only after American paleontologist Stephen Jay Gould wrote The Mismeasure of Man in the 1980s. Mansell Upham, a researcher and jurist specializing in colonial South African history, also helped spur the movement to bring Baartman's remains back to South Africa. After the victory of the African National Congress (ANC) in the 1994 South African general election, President Nelson Mandela formally requested that France return the remains. After much legal wrangling and debates in the French National Assembly, France acceded to the request on 6 March 2002. Her remains were repatriated to her homeland, the Gamtoos Valley, on 6 May 2002, and they were buried on 9 August 2002 on Vergaderingskop, a hill in the town of Hankey over 200 years after her birth.

Symbolism 
Sarah Baartman was not the only Khoikhoi to be taken from her homeland. Her story is sometimes used to illustrate social and political strains, and through this, some facts have been lost. Dr. Yvette Abrahams, professor of women and gender studies at the University of the Western Cape, writes, "we lack academic studies that view Sarah Baartman as anything other than a symbol. Her story becomes marginalized, as it is always used to illustrate some other topic." Baartman is used to represent African discrimination and suffering in the West although there were many other Khoikhoi people who were taken to Europe. Historian Neil Parsons writes of two Khoikhoi children 13 and six years old respectively, who were taken from South Africa and displayed at a holiday fair in Elberfeld, Prussia, in 1845. Bosjemans, a travelling show including two Khoikhoi men, women, and a baby, toured Britain, Ireland, and France from 1846 to 1855. P. T. Barnum's show "Little People" advertised a 16-year-old Khoikhoi girl named Flora as the "missing link" and acquired six more Khoikhoi children later.

Baartman's tale may be better known because she was the first Khoikhoi taken from her homeland, or because of the extensive exploitation and examination of her body by scientists such as Georges Cuvier, an anatomist, and the public as well as the mistreatment she received during and after her lifetime. She was brought to the West for her "exaggerated" female form, and the European public developed an obsession with her reproductive organs. Her body parts were on display at the Musée de l'Homme for 150 years, sparking awareness and sympathy in the public eye. Although Baartman was the first Khoikhoi to land in Europe, much of her story has been lost, and she is defined by her exploitation in the West.

Her body as a foundation for science

Julien-Joseph Virey used Sarah Baartman's published image to validate typologies. In his essay "Dictionnaire des sciences medicales" (Dictionary of medical sciences), he summarizes the true nature of the black female within the framework of accepted medical discourse. Virey focused on identifying her sexual organs as more developed and distinct in comparison to white female organs. All of his theories regarding sexual primitivism are influenced and supported by the anatomical studies and illustrations of Sarah Baartman which were created by Georges Cuvier.

It has been suggested by anthropologists that this body type was once more widespread in humans, based on carvings of female forms dating to the Paleolithic era which are collectively known as Venus figurines, also referred to as Steatopygian Venuses.

Sexism
From 1814 to 1870, there were at least seven scientific descriptions of the bodies of black women done in comparative anatomy. Cuvier's dissection of Baartman helped shape European science. Baartman, along with several other African women who were dissected, were referred to as Hottentots, or sometimes Bushwoman. The "savage woman" was seen as very distinct from the "civilised female" of Europe, thus 19th-century scientists were fascinated by "the Hottentot Venus". In the 1800s, people in London were able to pay two shillings apiece to gaze upon her body. Baartman was considered a freak of nature. For extra pay, one could even poke her with a stick or finger.

Colonialism
There has been much speculation and study about colonialist influence that relates to Baartman's name, social status, her illustrated and performed presentation as the "Hottentot Venus" though considered an extremely offensive term, and the negotiation for her body's return to her homeland. These components and events in Baartman's life have been used by activists and theorists to determine the ways in which 19th-century European colonists exercised control and authority over Khoikhoi people and simultaneously crafted racist and sexist ideologies about their culture. In addition to this, recent scholars have begun to analyze the surrounding events leading up to Baartman's return to her homeland and conclude that it is an expression of recent contemporary post colonial objectives.

In Janet Shibamoto's book review of Deborah Cameron's book Feminism and Linguistic Theory, Shibamoto discusses Cameron's study on the patriarchal context within language, which consequentially influences the way in which women continue to be contained by or subject to ideologies created by the patriarchy. Many scholars have presented information on how Baartman's life was heavily controlled and manipulated by colonialist and patriarchal language.

Baartman grew up on a farm. There is no historical documentation of her indigenous Khoisan name. She was given the Dutch name "Saartjie" by Dutch colonists who occupied the land she lived on during her childhood. According to Clifton Crais and Pamela Scully:

Her first name is the Cape Dutch form for "Sarah" which marked her as a colonialist's servant. "Saartje" the diminutive, was also a sign of affection. Encoded in her first name were the tensions of affection and exploitation. Her surname literally means "bearded man" in Dutch. It also means uncivilized, uncouth, barbarous, savage. Saartjie Baartman – the savage servant.

Dutch colonisers also bestowed the term "Hottentot", which is derived from "hot" and "tot", Dutch approximations of common sounds in the Khoi language. The Dutch used this word when referencing Khoikhoi people because of the clicking sounds and staccato pronunciations that characterise the Khoikhoi language; these components of the Khoikhoi language were considered strange and "bestial" to Dutch colonisers. The term was used until the late 20th century, at which point most people understood its effect as a derogatory term.

Travelogues that circulated in Europe would describe Africa as being "uncivilised" and lacking regard for religious virtue. Travelogues and imagery depicting Black women as "sexually primitive" and "savage" enforced the belief that it was in Africa's best interest to be colonised by European settlers. Cultural and religious conversion was considered to be an altruistic act with imperialist undertones; colonisers believed that they were reforming and correcting Khoisan culture in the name of the Christian faith and empire. Scholarly arguments discuss how Baartman's body became a symbolic depiction of "all African women" as "fierce, savage, naked, and untamable" and became a crucial role in colonising parts of Africa and shaping narratives.

During the lengthy negotiation to have Baartman's body returned to her home country after her death, the assistant curator of the Musée de l'Homme, Philippe Mennecier, argued against her return, stating: "We never know what science will be able to tell us in the future. If she is buried, this chance will be lost ... for us she remains a very important treasure." According to Sadiah Qureshi, due to the continued treatment of Baartman's body as a cultural artifact, Philippe Mennecier's statement is contemporary evidence of the same type of ideology that surrounded Baartman's body while she was alive in the 18th century.

Feminist reception

Traditional iconography of Sarah Baartman and feminist contemporary art
Many African female diasporic artists have criticised the traditional iconography of Baartman. According to the studies of contemporary feminists, traditional iconography and historical illustrations of Baartman are effective in revealing the ideological representation of black women in art throughout history. Such studies assess how the traditional iconography of the black female body was institutionally and scientifically defined in the 19th century.

Renee Cox, Renée Green, Joyce Scott, Lorna Simpson, Cara Mae Weems and Deborah Willis are artists who seek to investigate contemporary social and cultural issues that still surround the African female body. Sander Gilman, a cultural and literary historian states: "While many groups of African Blacks were known to Europeans in the 19th century, the Hottentot remained representative of the essence of the Black, especially the Black female. Both concepts fulfilled the iconographic function in the perception and representation of the world."
His article "Black Bodies, White Bodies: Toward an Iconography of Female Sexuality in the Late Nineteenth Century Art, Medicine and Literature" traces art historical records of black women in European art, and also proves that the association of black women with concupiscence within art history has been illustrated consistently since the beginning of the Middle Ages.

Lyle Ashton Harris and Renee Valerie Cox worked in collaboration to produce the photographic piece Hottentot Venus 2000. In this piece, Harris photographs Victoria Cox who presents herself as Baartman while wearing large, sculptural, gilded metal breasts and buttocks attached to her body.

"Permitted" is an installation piece created by Renée Green inspired by Sarah Baartman. Green created a specific viewing arrangement to investigate the European perception of the black female body as "exotic", "bizarre" and "monstrous". Viewers were prompted to step onto the installed platform which was meant to evoke a stage, where Baartman may have been exhibited. Green recreates the basic setting of Baartman's exhibition. At the centre of the platform, which there is a large image of Baartman, and wooden rulers or slats with an engraved caption by Francis Galton encouraging viewers to measure Baartman's buttocks. In the installation there is also a peephole that allows viewers to see an image of Baartman standing on a crate. According to Willis, the implication of the peephole, demonstrates how ethnographic imagery of the black female form in the 19th century functioned as a form of pornography for Europeans present at Baartmans exhibit.

In her film Reassemblage: From the firelight to the screen, Trinh T. Minh-ha comments on the ethnocentric bias that the colonisers eye applies to the naked female form, arguing that this bias causes the nude female body to be seen as inherently sexually provocative, promiscuous and pornographic within the context of European or western culture.
Feminist artists are interested in re-representing Baartman's image, and work to highlight the stereotypes and ethnocentric bias surrounding the black female body based on art historical representations and iconography that occurred before, after and during Baartman's lifetime.

Media representation and feminist criticism
In November 2014, Paper Magazine released a cover of Kim Kardashian in which she was illustrated as balancing a champagne glass on her extended rear. The cover received much criticism for endorsing "the exploitation and fetishism of the black female body". The similarities with the way in which Baartman was represented as the "Hottentot Venus" during the 19th century have prompted much criticism and commentary.

According to writer Geneva S. Thomas, anyone that is aware of black women's history under colonialist influence would consequentially be aware that Kardashian's photo easily elicits memory regarding the visual representation of Baartman.
The photographer and director of the photo, Jean-Paul Goude, based the photo on his previous work "Carolina Beaumont", taken of a nude model in 1976 and published in his book Jungle Fever.

A People Magazine article in 1979 about his relationship with model Grace Jones describes Goude in the following statement:

Jean-Paul has been fascinated with women like Grace since his youth. The son of a French engineer and an American-born dancer, he grew up in a Paris suburb. From the moment he saw West Side Story and the Alvin Ailey dance troupe, he found himself captivated by "ethnic minorities" — black girls, PRs. "I had jungle fever." He now says, "Blacks are the premise of my work."

Days before the shoot, Goude often worked with his models to find the best "hyperbolised" position to take his photos. His model and partner, Grace Jones, would also pose for days prior to finally acquiring the perfect form. "That's the basis of my entire work," Goude states, "creating a credible illusion." Similarly, Baartman and other black female slaves were illustrated and depicted in a specific form to identify features, which were seen as proof of ideologies regarding black female primitivism.

The professional background of Goude and the specific posture and presentation of Kardashian's image in the recreation on the cover of Paper Magazine has caused feminist critics to comment how the objectification of the Baartman's body and the ethnographic representation of her image in 19th-century society presents a comparable and complementary parallel to how Kardashian is currently represented in the media.

In response to the November 2014 photograph of Kim Kardashian, Cleuci de Oliveira published an article on Jezebel titled "Saartjie Baartman: The Original Bootie Queen", which claims that Baartman was "always an agent in her own path." Oliveira goes on to assert that Baartman performed on her own terms and was unwilling to view herself as a tool for scientific advancement, an object of entertainment, or a pawn of the state.

Neelika Jayawardane, a literature professor and editor of the website Africa is a Country, published a response to Oliveira's article. Jayawardane criticises de Oliveira's work, stating that she "did untold damage to what the historical record shows about Baartman". Jayawardane's article is cautious about introducing what she considers false agency to historical figures such as Baartman.

An article entitled "Body Talk: Feminism, Sexuality and the Body in the Work of Six African Women Artists", curated by Cameroonian-born Koyo Kouoh", which mentions Baartman's legacy and its impact on young female African artists. The work linked to Baartman is meant to reference the ethnographic exhibits of the 19th century that enslaved Baartman and displayed her naked body. Artist Valérie Oka's (Untitled, 2015) rendered a live performance of a black naked woman in a cage with the door swung open, walking around a sculpture of male genitalia, repeatedly. Her work was so impactful it led one audience member to proclaim, "Do we allow this to happen because we are in the white cube, or are we revolted by it?". Oka's work has been described as 'black feminist art' where the female body is a site for activism and expression. The article also mentions other African female icons and how artists are expressing themselves through performance and discussion by posing the question "How Does the White Man Represent the Black Woman?".

Social scientists James McKay and Helen Johnson cited Baartman to fit newspaper coverage of the African-American tennis players Venus and Serena Williams within racist trans-historical narratives of "pornographic eroticism" and "sexual grotesquerie." According to McKay and Johnson, white male reporters covering the Williams sisters have fixated upon their on-court fashions and their muscular bodies, while downplaying their on-court achievements, describing their bodies as mannish, animalistic, or hyper-sexual, rather than well-developed. Their victories have been attributed to their supposed natural physical superiorities, while their defeats have been blamed on their supposed lack of discipline. This analysis claims that commentary on the size of Serena's breasts and bottom, in particular, mirrors the spectacle made of Baartman's body.

Reclaiming the story
In recent years, some black women have found her story to be a source of empowerment, one that protests the ideals of white mainstream beauty, as curvaceous bodies are increasingly lauded in popular culture and mass media.

Paramount Chief Glen Taaibosch, chair of the Gauteng Khoi and San Council, says that today "we call her our Hottentot Queen" and honour her.

Legacy and Honors
Baartman became an icon in South Africa as representative of many aspects of the nation's history.
 The Saartjie Baartman Centre for Women and Children, a refuge for survivors of domestic violence, opened in Cape Town in 1999.
 South Africa's first offshore environmental protection vessel, the Sarah Baartman, is also named after her.
 In 2015 South Africa's former Cacadu District Municipality was renamed Sarah Baartman District Municipality in her honor.
 On 8 December 2018, the University of Cape Town made the decision to rename Memorial Hall, at the centre of the campus, to Sarah Baartman Hall. This follows the earlier removal of "Jameson" from the hall's name.

Cultural references 
 On 10 January 1811, at the New Theatre, London, a pantomime called "The Hottentot Venus" featured at the end of the evening's entertainment.
 In William Makepeace Thackeray's 1847 novel Vanity Fair, George Osborne angrily refuses his father's instruction to marry a West Indian mulatto heiress by referring to Miss Swartz as "that Hottentot Venus".
 In "Crinoliniana" (1863), a poem satirising Victorian fashion, the author compares a woman in a crinoline to a "Venus" from "the Cape".
 In James Joyce's 1916 novel A Portrait of the Artist as a Young Man, the protagonist, Stephen Dedalus, refers to "the great flanks of Venus" after a reference to the Hottentot people, when discussing the discrepancies between cultural perceptions of female beauty. 
 Dame Edith Sitwell referred to her allusively in "Hornpipe", a poem in the satirical collection Façade.
 In Jean Rhys' 1934 novel Voyage in the Dark, the Creole protagonist Anna Morgan is referred to as "the Hottentot".
 Elizabeth Alexander explores her story in a 1987 poem and 1990 book, both entitled The Venus Hottentot.
 Hebrew poet Mordechai Geldman wrote a poem titled "THE HOTTENTOT VENUS" exploring the subject in his 1993 book Eye.
 Suzan-Lori Parks used the story of Baartman as the basis for her 1996 play Venus.
 Zola Maseko directed a documentary on Baartman, The Life and Times of Sarah Baartman, in 1998.
 Lyle Ashton Harris collaborated with the model Renee Valerie Cox to produce a photographic image, Hottentot Venus 2000.
 Barbara Chase-Riboud wrote the novel Hottentot Venus: A Novel (2003), which humanizes Sarah Baartman
 Cathy Park Hong wrote a poem entitled "Hottentot Venus" in her 2007 book Translating Mo'um.
 Lydia R. Diamond's 2008 play Voyeurs de Venus investigates Baartman's life from a postcolonial perspective.
 A movie entitled Black Venus, directed by Abdellatif Kechiche and starring Yahima Torres as Sarah, was released in 2010.
 Hendrik Hofmeyr composed a 20-minute opera entitled Saartjie, which was to be premiered by Cape Town Opera in November 2010.
 Joanna Bator refers to a fictional descendant in her novel: 
 Douglas Kearney published a poem titled "Drop It Like It's Hottentot Venus" in April 2012.
 Diane Awerbuck has Baartman feature as a central thread in her novel Home Remedies. The work is critical of the "grandstanding" that so often surrounds Baartman: as Awerbuck has explained, "Saartjie Baartman is not a symbol. She is a dead woman who once suffered in a series of cruel systems. The best way we can remember her is by not letting it happen again."
Brett Bailey's Exhibit B (a human zoo) depicts Baartman.
Jamila Woods' song "Blk Girl Soldier" on her 2016 album Heavn references Baartman's story: "They put her body in a jar and forget her".
Nitty Scott makes reference to Baartman in her song "For Sarah Baartman" on her 2017 album CREATURE!.
The Carters, Jay-Z and Beyoncé, make mention of her in their song "Black Effect": "Stunt with your curls, your lips, Sarah Baartman hips", off their 2018 album Everything is Love.
The University of Cape Town made the historic decision to rename Memorial Hall to Sarah Baartman Hall (8 December 2018).
Zodwa Nyoni debuted at Summerhall in 2019, a new play called A Khoisan Woman - a play about the Hottentot Venus.
Royce 5'9 references Sarah Baartman in his song "Upside Down" in 2020.
Tessa McWatt discusses Baartman and the Hottentot in her 2019/20 book, "Shame on Me: An Anatomy of Race and Belonging".
Meghan Swaby explores the ideas of colonialism and culture as they relate to BIPOC and Saartjie Baartman in her book/play, "Venus' Daughter".

See also 

 Awoulaba
 Body shape
 Female body shape
 Feminine beauty ideal
 Feminism and racism
 Human variability
 Human zoo
 Ota Benga
 Racial fetishism
 Racism in Europe
 Scientific racism
 Tono Maria

References

Bibliography 
 
 
 
 
 
Willis, Deborah (Ed.) Black Venus 2010: They Called Her 'Hottentot'. Philadelphia, PA: Temple University Press. .

Further reading 
 Fausto-Sterling, Anne (1995). "Gender, Race, and Nation: The Comparative Anatomy of 'Hottentot' Women in Europe, 1815–1817". In Terry, Jennifer and Jacqueline Urla (Ed.) Deviant Bodies: Critical Perspectives on Difference in Science and Popular Culture, 19–48. Bloomington, Indiana University Press. .
 
 
 
 Ritter, Sabine (2010). Facetten der Sarah Baartman: Repräsentationen und Rekonstruktionen der ‚Hottentottenvenus'''. Münster: Lit Verlag. .

Films
 Abdellatif Kechiche: Vénus noire (Black Venus). Paris: MK2, 2009
 Zola Maseko: The life and times of Sara Baartman''. Icarus, 1998

External links 
 
 South Africa government site about her, including Diana Ferrus's pivotal poem
 A French print 
 Mara Verna's interactive audio and video piece including a bibliography
 Guardian article on the return of her remains
 A documentary film called The Life and Times of Sara Baartman by Zola Maseko
 The Saartjie Baartman Story

1770s births
1815 deaths
Year of birth uncertain
Art and cultural repatriation
Khoikhoi
People from the Eastern Cape
Sideshow performers
18th-century South African people
19th-century South African women
Ethnological show business
South African emigrants to France
South African expatriates in the United Kingdom
Scientific racism